Ginette Maddie (1898–1980) was a French actress known for her appearances in French and German films during the silent era.

Selected filmography
 The Black Diamond (1922)
 Sarati the Terrible (1923)
 The Gardens of Murcia (1923)
 The Thruster (1924)
 The Heirs of Uncle James (1924)
 The Painter and His Model (1924)
 The Pink Diamond (1926)
 Alone (1931)

References

Bibliography
 Hardt, Ursula. From Caligari to California: Erich Pommer's life in the International Film Wars. Berghahn Books, 1996.
 Klossner, Michael. The Europe of 1500-1815 on Film and Television: A Worldwide Filmography of Over 2550 Works, 1895 Through 2000. McFarland & Company, 2002.

External links

1898 births
1980 deaths
French film actresses
French silent film actresses
20th-century French actresses
Actresses from Paris